Johann Christian Daniel von Schreber (17 January 1739 in Weißensee, Thuringia – 10 December 1810 in Erlangen), often styled J.C.D. von Schreber, was a German naturalist.

Career
He was appointed professor of materia medica at the University of Erlangen in 1769.

In 1774, he began writing a multivolume set of books entitled Die Säugethiere in Abbildungen nach der Natur mit Beschreibungen, which focused on the mammals of the world. Many of the animals included were given a scientific name for the first time, following the binomial system of Carl Linnaeus. From 1791 until his death in 1810, he was the president of the German Academy of Sciences Leopoldina. He was elected a member of the Royal Swedish Academy of Sciences in 1787. In April 1795, he was elected a Fellow of the Royal Society Numerous honors were bestowed on him, including the office of an imperial count palatine.

Schreber also wrote on entomology, notably  Schreberi Novae Species Insectorvm. His herbarium collection has been preserved in the Botanische Staatssammlung München since 1813.

Works 

 Beschreibung der Gräser (1.1769 - 3.1810)
 Lithographia Halensis (1758)
 Schreberi Novae Species Insectorvm (1759)
 Die Säugetiere in Abbildungen nach der Natur mit Beschreibungen (1.1774 - 64.1804)
 Theses medicae (1761)

Gallery
Plates from Die Säugetiere in Abbildungen nach der Natur mit Beschreibungen 1774-1804.

References

External links

Online version of Schreberi Novae Species Insectorvm at GDZ
 Gaedike, R.; Groll, E. K. & Taeger, A. 2012: Bibliography of the entomological literature from the beginning until 1863 : online database - version 1.0 - Senckenberg Deutsches Entomologisches Institut.

1739 births
1810 deaths
18th-century German botanists
19th-century German botanists
18th-century German zoologists
19th-century German zoologists
People from Weißensee, Thuringia
Imperial counts palatine
Edlers of Germany
German entomologists
German taxonomists
University of Erlangen-Nuremberg alumni
Presidents of the German Academy of Sciences Leopoldina
Fellows of the Royal Society
Honorary members of the Saint Petersburg Academy of Sciences
Members of the Royal Swedish Academy of Sciences